Ennerdale  may refer to:
 Ennerdale, Cumbria, a valley in the Lake District in England
 Ennerdale Water, a lake in Ennerdale, Cumbria
Ennerdale Bridge, a nearby settlement
 Ennerdale, Gauteng, a suburb of Johannesburg, South Africa
 Ennerdale Link Bridges, see River Hull#Bridges

 RFA Ennerdale, the name given to a number of vessels of the Royal Fleet Auxiliary (UK)